In the 1977-78 season Juventus competed in Serie A, Coppa Italia and UEFA Cup.

Summary 
The team after won the last league title in fotofinish with record of 51 points, did not substantial changes in their first line-up and  brought young promises  such as Pietro Paolo Virdis, Pierino Fanna and Vinicio Verza to their debut at top level.

The team was defeated in Rome 0-3 by Lazio the only loss in the first half of the season. Liedholm and his Milan finish the year on 31 December at the top, however with a draw at Bergamo, they were reached in first place by Juventus; the next week the bianconeri took the sole leadership on 22 January 1978, grabbing the 'Winter title' with 2 points up local rivals Torino.

The second half of the tournament for Juventus was calm on the top without losing a single game for the rest of the tournament.

Juventus secured the championship  after  a  visit draw in Rome with a round  of anticipation to the season finale.

In Coppa Italia the team faced a shocking elimination in Second round.

In European Cup the  squad reached the Semifinals being surprisingly took out by the belgian Club Brugges with a superb tactic using the offside during the two matches.

After the team clinched the title, Italian national team manager Enzo Bearzot will line up a massive eight players as regulars starters from this Juventus squad — Zoff, Gentile, Scirea, Benetti, Tardelli, Bettega, Cabrini and Causio  —  during the 1978 FIFA World Cup in Argentina (also Cuccureddu was called), where they reached a decent 4th place. This group of players was known as Blocco-Juve (Juve Block), or Blocco Juventus

Squad

Competitions

Serie A

League table

Matches

Coppa Italia

First round

Second round

European Cup

First round

Second round

Quarterfinals

Semifinals

Statistics

Serie A

Appearances
30.Dino Zoff
30.Antonello Cuccureddu
30.Roberto Bettega
30.Franco Causio
29.Gaetano Scirea
28.Claudio Gentile
27.Romeo Benetti
26.Francesco Morini
26.Marco Tardelli
26.Giuseppe Furino
21.Roberto Boninsegna
15.Antonio Cabrini
13.Pietro Fanna
10.Pietro Paolo Virdis
5.Spinosi
5.Verza

Goalscorers
11.Roberto Bettega
10.Roberto Boninsegna
5.Romeo Benetti
4.Marco Tardelli
3.Franco Causio
3.Claudio Gentile
2.Antonello Cuccureddu
2.Pietro Fanna
1.Pietro Paolo Virdis
1.Verza

See also
Blocco-Juve

References

External links 
 

Juventus F.C. seasons
Juventus
Italian football championship-winning seasons